Valans are a Malayali caste based in Kerala, India. Valans comes under as the subcaste of Dheevara (caste). Dheevara (caste) is a grouping of fishing castes from the Kerala state of South India.

According to some, the name derives from their use of tail nets (valu vala) for fishing. According to the people's traditional beliefs, they were brought to Kerala by Parasurama to work as boatmen, conveying passengers across the rivers and backwaters on the west coast.

Another tradition is that the Valans were Arayans, and they became a separate caste only after one of the Perumal had selected some of their families for boat service, and conferred on them special privileges. They pride themselves that their caste is one of remote antiquity, and claim that ancient members included Vyasa, author of the Vishnu Purana, and Guhan, the legendary boatman who assisted Rama.

There are no subdivisions in the caste, but the members are said to belong to four exogamous Illam called "Nalillacaran"  (Illom is the clan name not the name of brahmin household), namely, Alayakkad, Ennalu, Vaisyagiram and Vazhapally. These correspond to the gotras of the Brahmins, or to four clans, the members of each of which are perhaps descended from a common ancestor. According to a tradition current among them, they were once attached to the four Namboothiri illam above mentioned for service of some kind, and were even the descendants of the members of the illams, but were doomed to the present state of degradation on account of some misconduct. Their homes are called "Agam".

Even now, these Brahmin families are held in great respect by Valans, who when afflicted with family calamities, visit the respective illams with present of a few packets of betel leaves and few annas, to receive the blessing of Brahman masters, which, according to their belief, may tend to avert them.

They were men engaged in boat service or farmers and some practiced medicine and ayurveda, vishachikitsa and in some places were affluent and were landlords

References

Indian castes